"Pac's Life" is a single written and performed by American rappers Tupac Shakur and T.I and R&B singer Ashanti, produced by L. T. Hutton for Shakur's posthumously released album of the same name. It is a hip hop and R&B song; the second Tupac verse was recycled from a song titled "This Life I Lead". T.I. said in an interview that working on the song was an honor, as he idolized him while growing up.

The single peaked at #1 on the Billboard Bubbling Under R&B/Hip-Hop Singles in the December 2, 2006 issue of Billboard magazine. It was also a top ten hit in Ireland and peaked at number 21 in the UK. On MTV Australia, "Pac's Life" peaked at the number 1 spot on the Hip Hop Countdown, beating new releases from Jay-Z, Eminem and 50 Cent, and Nas.

The original version of the song samples Prince's "Pop Life" and is a minute and 34 seconds in duration, with some speculating it might have been cut off when it was initially leaked. It first features Tupac's verse and Tupac singing the hook.

Music video
The video made its world premiere on the BET music network in the United States on November 22, 2006. The video was featured on BET's Access Granted, where viewers saw the process of filming the video for "Pac's Life". Both T.I. and Ashanti were featured in the long-awaited video, which was filmed at the Tupac Amaru Shakur Center for the Arts, in Atlanta, Georgia. The video premiered on MTV on November 28, 2006.

Official remix
A remix with Snoop Dogg and Chris Starr appeared on the album, changing the vocals, and changing the recycled verse to a verse made by Snoop Dogg. The positioning of some ad-libs was also changed and Snoop Dogg was implemented into the chorus of the song which was originally only performed by Ashanti.

Track listing
12" (EU)
 "Pac's Life" (album version) (featuring T.I. and Ashanti)
 "Scared Straight"
 "Untouchable (Swizz Beatz Remix)"

CD (UK)
 "Pac's Life" (album version) (featuring T.I. and Ashanti)
 "Scared Straight"

Charts

Release history

References

2006 songs
2007 singles
Ashanti (singer) songs
Tupac Shakur songs
T.I. songs
Songs released posthumously
Songs written by Ashanti (singer)
Songs written by T.I.
Songs written by Tupac Shakur
Song recordings produced by L.T. Hutton